East Brookfield is the name of the following places in the United States:

East Brookfield, Massachusetts, a New England town
East Brookfield (CDP), Massachusetts, the main village in the town
East Brookfield, Vermont
East Brookfield River in Massachusetts